James Harold Wilson, Baron Wilson of Rievaulx,  (11 March 1916 – 24 May 1995) was a British statesman and politician who served as Prime Minister of the United Kingdom twice, from October 1964 to June 1970, and again from March 1974 to April 1976. He was the Leader of the Labour Party from 1963 to 1976, and was a Member of Parliament (MP) from 1945 to 1983. Wilson is the only Labour leader to have formed administrations following four general elections.

Born in Huddersfield, Yorkshire, to a politically active middle-class family, Wilson won a scholarship to attend Royds Hall Grammar School and went on to study modern history at Jesus College, Oxford. He was later an economic history lecturer at New College, Oxford, and a research fellow at University College, Oxford. Elected to Parliament in 1945 for the seat of Ormskirk, Wilson was immediately appointed to the Attlee government as a Parliamentary Secretary; he became Secretary for Overseas Trade in 1947, and was elevated to the Cabinet shortly thereafter as President of the Board of Trade. In 1950, he moved to represent the nearby seat of Huyton. Following Labour's defeat at the 1955 election, Wilson joined the Shadow Cabinet as Shadow Chancellor, and was moved to the role of Shadow Foreign Secretary in 1961. When Labour Leader Hugh Gaitskell died suddenly in January 1963, Wilson won the subsequent leadership election to replace him, becoming Leader of the Opposition.

Wilson led Labour to a narrow victory at the 1964 election. His first period as prime minister saw a period of low unemployment and relative economic prosperity, although this would later become hindered by significant problems with Britain's external balance of payments. The Wilson government oversaw significant societal changes in the United Kingdom, abolishing both capital punishment and theatre censorship, decriminalising male homosexuality in England and Wales, relaxing the divorce laws, limiting immigration, and liberalising birth control and abortion law. In the midst of this programme Wilson called a snap election in 1966, which Labour won with a much increased majority. Wilson's government armed Nigeria during the Biafran War. In 1969, he sent British troops to Northern Ireland.

After losing the 1970 election to Edward Heath's Conservatives, Wilson chose to remain in the Labour leadership, and spent four years back in the role of Leader of the Opposition before leading Labour through the February 1974 election, which resulted in a hung parliament. Although the Conservatives had won more votes than Labour, Heath's talks with the Liberal Party failed, and Wilson was appointed prime minister for a second time, now as leader of a minority government; Wilson called a snap election in October 1974, which gave Labour a small majority. During his second term as prime minister, Wilson oversaw the referendum that confirmed the UK's membership of the European Communities. In March 1976 he suddenly announced his resignation as prime minister, and was succeeded by James Callaghan. Wilson remained in the House of Commons until retiring in 1983, when he was elevated to the House of Lords as Lord Wilson of Rievaulx.

Historians evaluate Wilson in terms of leading the Labour Party through difficult political issues with considerable skill. Wilson's reputation was low when he left office and was still poor in 2016. Key issues he faced included the role of public ownership, membership of the European Communities, and how to avoid committing British troops to the Vietnam War. Wilson's approach to socialism was regarded by some in the Labour Party as too moderate, by others too left-wing. A member of Labour's soft left, he joked about leading a Cabinet made up mostly of social democrats, comparing himself to a Bolshevik revolutionary presiding over a Tsarist cabinet, but there was little to divide him ideologically from the majority of his cabinet. His stated ambitions of substantially improving Britain's long-term economic performance, applying technology more democratically, and reducing inequality went to some extent unfulfilled.

Early life
Wilson was born at Warneford Road, Cowlersley, in the western suburbs of the mill town of Huddersfield, in the West Riding of Yorkshire, England, on 11 March 1916. He came from a political family: his father James Herbert Wilson (1882–1971) was a works chemist who had been active in the Liberal Party, going as far as to be Winston Churchill's deputy election agent in a 1908 by-election, but later joined the Labour Party. His mother Ethel (née Seddon; 1882–1957) was a schoolteacher before her marriage; in 1901 her brother Harold Seddon settled in Western Australia and became a local political leader. When Wilson was eight, he visited London and a much-reproduced photograph was taken of him standing on the doorstep of 10 Downing Street. At the age of ten, he went with his family to Australia, where he became fascinated with the pomp and glamour of politics. On the way home, he told his mother, "I am going to be prime minister."

Education
Wilson won a scholarship to attend Royds Hall Grammar School, his local grammar school (now a comprehensive school) in Huddersfield in Yorkshire. His father, working as an industrial chemist, was made redundant in December 1930, and it took him nearly two years to find work; he moved to Spital in Cheshire, on the Wirral, to do so. Wilson continued his education in the Sixth Form at the Wirral Grammar School for Boys, where he became Head Boy.

Wilson did well at school and, although he missed getting a scholarship, he obtained an exhibition; this, when topped up by a county grant, enabled him to study Modern History at Jesus College, Oxford, from 1934. At Oxford, Wilson was moderately active in politics as a member of the Liberal Party but was strongly influenced by G. D. H. Cole. His politics tutor, R. B. McCallum, considered Wilson as the best student he ever had. He graduated in PPE (Philosophy, Politics and Economics) with "an outstanding first class Bachelor of Arts degree, with alphas on every paper" in the final examinations, and a series of major academic awards. Biographer Roy Jenkins wrote:
Academically his results put him among prime ministers in the category of Peel, Gladstone, Asquith, and no one else. But...he lacked originality. What he was superb at was the quick assimilation of knowledge, combined with an ability to keep it ordered in his mind and to present it lucidly in a form welcome to his examiners.

He continued in academia, becoming one of the youngest Oxford dons of the century at the age of 21. He was a lecturer in Economic History at New College from 1937, and a research fellow at University College.

Marriage
On New Year's Day 1940, in the chapel of Mansfield College, Oxford, he married Mary Baldwin, who remained his wife until his death. Mary Wilson became a published poet. They had two sons, Robin and Giles (named after Giles Alington); Robin became a professor of Mathematics, and Giles became a teacher and later a train driver. In their twenties, his sons were under a kidnap threat from the IRA because of their father's prominence.

War service
On the outbreak of the Second World War, Wilson volunteered for military service but was classed as a specialist and moved into the civil service instead. For much of this time, he was a research assistant to William Beveridge, the Master of University College, working on the issues of unemployment and the trade cycle. Wilson later became a statistician and economist for the coal industry. He was Director of Economics and Statistics at the Ministry of Fuel and Power in 1943–44 and was made an OBE for his services.

He was to remain passionately interested in statistics, becoming a Fellow of the Royal Statistical Society in 1943. As President of the Board of Trade, he was the driving force behind the Statistics of Trade Act 1947, which is still the authority governing most economic statistics in Great Britain. He was instrumental as prime minister in appointing Claus Moser as head of the Central Statistical Office, and was president of the Royal Statistical Society between 1972 and 1973.

Member of Parliament (1945–1964)
As the war drew to an end, he searched for a seat to contest at the impending general election. He was selected for the constituency of Ormskirk, then held by Stephen King-Hall. Wilson agreed to be adopted as the candidate immediately rather than delay until the election was called, and was therefore compelled to resign from his position in the Civil Service. He served as Praelector in Economics at University College between his resignation and his election to the House of Commons. He also used this time to write A New Deal for Coal, which used his wartime experience to argue for the nationalisation of the coal mines on the grounds of the improved efficiency he predicted would ensue.

In the 1945 general election, Wilson won his seat in the Labour landslide. To his surprise, he was immediately appointed to the government by Prime Minister Clement Attlee as Parliamentary Secretary to the Ministry of Works. Two years later, he became Secretary for Overseas Trade, in which capacity he made several official trips to the Soviet Union to negotiate supply contracts.

The boundaries of his Ormskirk constituency were significantly altered before the general election of 1950. He stood instead for the new seat of Huyton near Liverpool, and was narrowly elected; he served there for 33 years until 1983.

Cabinet Minister, 1947–1951

Bonfire of controls
Wilson was appointed President of the Board of Trade on 29 September 1947, becoming, at the age of 31, the youngest member of a British Cabinet in the 20th century. Initially Wilson favoured a more interventionist policy, seeking requirements for government officials to be seated on private boards of directors, further price controls, and nationalizations of private industries which opposed government policy. However, he abandoned these plans after his colleagues disagreed. He made it a priority to reduce wartime rationing, which he referred to as a "bonfire of controls". Wilson decided that the massive number of wartime controls was slowing the conversion to peacetime prosperity and he was committed to removing them as fast as possible.  He ended rationing of potatoes, bread and jam, as well as shoes and some other clothing controls. In November 1948 Wilson announced his Board of Trade had removed the need for over 200,000 licenses and permits.  By March 1949 he promised to remove the need for another 900,000, although meat remained in short supply and was still rationed, as was petrol.  Henry Irvine argues that Wilson's success with the bonfire controls established his reputation as a modernizing specialist, with both the general public and the political elite. Irving also argues that the selection timing and especially the publicity Wilson devoted to the bonfire represented the emerging skills of a brilliant young politician. While each major bonfire was justified in terms of technical economic advantages, it was selected and publicized widely to reach the largest possible audience so that everybody could understand that their bread and jam became free again.

Three ambitious young men
In mid-1949, with Chancellor of the Exchequer Stafford Cripps having gone to Switzerland in an attempt to recover his health, Wilson was one of a group of three young ministers, all of them former economics dons and wartime civil servants, convened to advise Prime Minister Attlee on financial matters. The others were Douglas Jay (Economic Secretary to the Treasury) and Hugh Gaitskell (Minister of Fuel and Power), both of whom soon grew to distrust him. Jay wrote of Wilson's role in the debates over whether or not to devalue sterling that "he changed sides three times within eight days and finished up facing both ways". Wilson was given the task during his Swiss holiday of taking a letter to Cripps informing him of the decision to devalue, to which Cripps had been opposed. Wilson had tarnished his reputation in both political and official circles. Although a successful minister, he was regarded as self-important. He was not seriously considered for the job of Chancellor when Cripps stepped down in October 1950—it was given to Gaitskell—possibly in part because of his cautious role during devaluation.

Wilson was becoming known in the Labour Party as a left-winger, and joined Aneurin Bevan and John Freeman in resigning from the government in April 1951 in protest at the introduction of National Health Service (NHS) medical charges to meet the financial demands imposed by the Korean War. At this time, Wilson was not yet regarded as a heavyweight politician: Hugh Dalton referred to him scornfully as "Nye [Bevan]'s dog".

After Labour lost the 1951 election, he became the Chairman of Keep Left, Bevan's political group. At the bitter Morecambe Conference in late 1952, Wilson was one of the Bevanites elected as constituency representatives to Labour's National Executive Committee (NEC), whilst senior right-wingers such as Dalton and Herbert Morrison were voted off.

Shadow Cabinet, 1954–1963
Wilson had never made much secret that his support of the left-wing Aneurin Bevan was opportunistic. In early 1954, Bevan resigned from the Shadow Cabinet (elected by Labour MPs when the party was in opposition) over Labour's support for the setting-up of the Southeast Asia Treaty Organization (SEATO). Wilson, who had been runner-up in the elections, stepped up to fill the vacant place. He was supported in this by Richard Crossman, but his actions angered Bevan and the other Bevanites.

Wilson's course in intra-party matters in the 1950s and early 1960s left him neither fully accepted nor trusted by the left or the right in the Labour Party. Despite his earlier association with Bevan, in 1955 he backed Hugh Gaitskell, the right-wing candidate in internal Labour Party terms, against Bevan for the party leadership election. Gaitskell appointed him Shadow Chancellor of the Exchequer in 1955, and he proved to be very effective. One of his procedural moves caused a substantial delay to the progress of the Government's Finance Bill in 1955, and his speeches as Shadow Chancellor from 1956 were widely praised for their clarity and wit. He coined the term "Gnomes of Zürich" to ridicule Swiss bankers for selling Britain short and pushing the pound sterling down by speculation. He conducted an inquiry into the Labour Party's organisation following its defeat in the 1955 general election; its report compared Labour's organisation to an antiquated "penny farthing" bicycle, and made various recommendations for improvements. Unusually, Wilson combined the job of Chairman of the House of Commons' Public Accounts Committee with that of Shadow Chancellor from 1959, holding that position until 1963.

Gaitskell's leadership was weakened after the Labour Party's 1959 defeat, his controversial attempt to ditch Labour's commitment to nationalisation by scrapping Clause Four, and his defeat at the 1960 Party Conference over a motion supporting unilateral nuclear disarmament. Bevan had died in July 1960, so Wilson established himself as a leader of the Labour left by launching an opportunistic but unsuccessful challenge to Gaitskell's leadership in November 1960. Wilson would later be moved to the position of Shadow Foreign Secretary in 1961, before he challenged for the deputy leadership in 1962 but was defeated by George Brown.

Opposition Leader, 1963–64

Gaitskell died in January 1963, just as the Labour Party had begun to unite and appeared to have a very good chance of winning the next election, with the Macmillan Government running into trouble. Timothy Heppell has explored how Wilson won the Labour Party leadership election.  Wilson had alienated the right wing of the party by his angry attempts to defeat Gaitskell in 1960 for the leadership, and George Brown in 1962 for the deputy leadership. These misadventures gave Wilson a reputation for disloyalty and divisiveness. Heppell identifies three factors whereby Wilson overcame these disadvantages. Firstly, he had united the party's left wing behind him and they showed no willingness to compromise. Secondly, the right wing, although more numerous, was deeply split between Brown and James Callaghan. Wilson took the lead on the first ballot and gained momentum on the second. Finally, Brown proved a poor campaigner, emphasizing divisive factors rather than his own credentials, allowing Wilson to emerge, surprisingly, as the unity candidate, thus becoming the Leader of the Labour Party and the Leader of the Opposition.

At the party's 1963 annual conference, Wilson made his best-remembered speech, on the implications of scientific and technological change. He argued that "the Britain that is going to be forged in the white heat of this revolution will be no place for restrictive practices or for outdated measures on either side of industry". This speech did much to set Wilson's reputation as a technocrat not tied to the prevailing class system.

Labour's 1964 election campaign was aided by the Profumo affair, a ministerial sex scandal that had mortally wounded Harold Macmillan and hurt the Conservatives. Wilson made capital without getting involved in the less salubrious aspects. (Asked for a statement on the scandal, he reportedly said "No comment ... in glorious Technicolor!"). Sir Alec Douglas-Home was an aristocrat who had given up his peerage to sit in the House of Commons and become prime minister upon Macmillan's resignation. To Wilson's comment that he was out of touch with ordinary people since he was the 14th Earl of Home, Home retorted, "I suppose Mr. Wilson is the fourteenth Mr. Wilson".

First period as prime minister (1964–1970)

Labour won the 1964 general election with a narrow majority of four seats, and Wilson became prime minister, the youngest person to hold that office since Lord Rosebery 70 years earlier. During 1965, by-election losses reduced the government's majority to a single seat; but in March 1966 Wilson took the gamble of calling another general election. The gamble paid off, because this time Labour achieved a 96-seat majority over the Conservatives, who the previous year had made Edward Heath their leader.

Domestic affairs
The 1964–1970 Labour government carried out a broad range of reforms during its time in office, in such areas as social security, civil liberties, housing, health, education, and worker's rights.

It is perhaps best remembered for the liberal social reforms introduced or supported by Home Secretary Roy Jenkins. Notable amongst these was the partial decriminalisation of male homosexuality and abortion, reform of divorce laws, the abolition of theatre censorship and capital punishment (except for a small number of offences — notably high treason) and various pieces of legislation addressing race relations and racial discrimination.

His government also undertook the easing of means testing for non-contributory welfare benefits, the linking of pensions to earnings, and the provision of industrial-injury benefits. Wilson's government also made significant reforms to education, most notably the expansion of comprehensive education and the creation of the Open University.

Economic policies
Wilson's government put faith in economic planning as a way to solve Britain's economic problems. The government's strategy involved setting up a Department of Economic Affairs (DEA) which would draw up a National Plan which was intended to promote growth and investment. Wilson believed that scientific progress was the key to economic and social advancement, as such he famously referred to the "white heat of technology", in reference to the modernisation of British industry. This was to be achieved through a new Ministry of Technology (shortened to "Mintech") which would coordinate research and development and support the swift adoption of new technology by industry, aided by government-funded infrastructure improvements.

In practice, however, events derailed much of the initial optimism. Upon coming to power, the government was informed that they had inherited an exceptionally large deficit of £800 million on Britain's external balance of trade. This partly reflected the preceding government's expansive fiscal policy in the run-up to the 1964 election. Immediately the pound came under enormous pressure, and many economists advocated devaluation of the pound in response, but Wilson resisted, reportedly in part out of concern that Labour, which had previously devalued sterling in 1949, would become tagged as "the party of devaluation". Wilson also believed that a devaluation would disproportionately harm low-income Britons with savings and poorer Commonwealth of Nations countries in the sterling area. The government instead opted to deal with the problem by imposing a temporary surcharge on imports, and a series of deflationary measures designed to reduce demand and therefore the inflow of imports. In the latter half of 1967, an attempt was made to prevent the recession in activity from going too far in the form of a stimulus to consumer durable spending through an easing of credit, which in turn prevented a rise in unemployment.

After a costly battle, market pressures forced the government to devalue the pound by 14% from $2.80 to $2.40 in November 1967. Wilson was much criticised for a broadcast soon after in which he assured listeners that the "pound in your pocket" had not lost its value. Economic performance did show some improvement after the devaluation, as economists had predicted. The devaluation, with accompanying austerity measures which ensured resources went into exports rather than domestic consumption, successfully restored the trade balance to surplus by 1969. In retrospect Wilson has been widely criticised for not devaluing earlier, however, he believed there were strong arguments against it, including the fear that it would set off a round of competitive devaluations, and concern about the impact price rises following a devaluation would have on people on low incomes.

The government's decision over its first three years to defend sterling's parity with traditional deflationary measures ran counter to hopes for an expansionist push for growth. The National Plan produced by the DEA in 1965 targeted an annual growth rate of 3.8%, however, under the restrained circumstances the actual average rate of growth between 1964 and 1970 was a far more modest 2.2%. The DEA itself was wound up in 1969. The government's other main initiative Mintech did have some success at switching research and development spending from military to civilian purposes, and of achieving increases in industrial productivity, although persuading industry to adopt new technology proved more difficult than had been hoped. Faith in indicative planning as a pathway to growth, embodied in the DEA and Mintech, was at the time by no means confined to the Labour Party. Wilson built on foundations that had been laid by his Conservative predecessors, in the shape, for example, of the National Economic Development Council (known as "Neddy") and its regional counterparts (the "little Neddies"). Government intervention in industry was greatly enhanced, with the National Economic Development Office greatly strengthened and the number of "little Neddies" was increased, from eight in 1964 to twenty-one in 1970. The government's policy of selective economic intervention was later characterised by the establishment of a new super-ministry of technology, a connexion not always publicly grasped, under Tony Benn.

The continued relevance of industrial nationalisation (a centrepiece of the post-War Labour government's programme) had been a key point of contention in Labour's internal struggles of the 1950s and early 1960s. Wilson's predecessor as leader, Hugh Gaitskell, had tried in 1960 to tackle the controversy head-on, with a proposal to expunge Clause Four (the public ownership clause) from the party's constitution, but had been forced to climb down. Wilson took a characteristically more subtle approach: No significant expansion of public ownership took place under Wilson's government, however, he placated the party's left-wing by renationalising the steel industry under the Iron and Steel Act 1967 (which had been denationalised by the Conservatives in the 1950s) creating the British Steel Corporation.

One innovation of the Wilson government was the creation in 1968 of the Girobank, a publicly owned bank which operated via the General Post Office network: As most working-class people in the 1960s did not have bank accounts, this was designed to serve their needs, as such it was billed as the "people's bank". Girobank was a long-term success, surviving until 2003.

Wilson's government presided over a rate of unemployment which was low by historic (and later) standards but did rise during his period in office. Between 1964 and 1966 the average rate of unemployment was 1.6%, while between 1966 and 1970 the average stood at 2.5%. He had entered power at a time when unemployment stood at around 400,000. It still stood at 371,000 by early 1966 after a steady fall during 1965, but by March 1967 it stood at 631,000. It fell again towards the end of the decade, standing at 582,000 by the time of the general election in June 1970.

Despite the economic difficulties faced by Wilson's government, it was able to achieve important advances in several domestic policy areas. As reflected by Wilson in 1971:

Social issues

Several liberalising social reforms were passed through parliament during Wilson's first period in government. These dealt with the death penalty, homosexual acts, abortion, censorship and the voting age. There were new restrictions on immigration. Wilson personally, coming culturally from a provincial non-conformist background, showed no particular enthusiasm for much of this agenda.

Education

Education held special significance for a socialist of Wilson's generation, given its role in both opening up opportunities for children from working-class backgrounds and enabling Britain to seize the potential benefits of scientific advances. Under the first Wilson government, for the first time in British history, more money was allocated to education than to defence. Wilson continued the rapid creation of new universities, in line with the recommendations of the Robbins Report, a bipartisan policy already in train when Labour took power.

Wilson promoted the concept of an Open University, to give adults who had missed out on tertiary education a second chance through part-time study and distance learning. His political commitment included assigning implementation responsibility to Baroness Lee, the widow of Aneurin Bevan. By 1981, 45,000 students had received degrees through the Open University. Money was also channelled into local-authority run colleges of education.

Wilson's record on secondary education is, by contrast, highly controversial. Pressure grew for the abolition of the selective principle underlying the "eleven-plus", and replacement with Comprehensive schools which would serve the full range of children (see the article 'grammar schools debate'). Comprehensive education became Labour Party policy. From 1966 to 1970, the proportion of children in comprehensive schools increased from about 10% to over 30%.

Labour pressed local authorities to convert grammar schools into comprehensives. Conversion continued on a large scale during the subsequent Conservative Heath administration, although the Secretary of State, Margaret Thatcher, ended the compulsion of local governments to convert.

A major controversy that arose during Wilson's first government was the decision that the government could not fulfil its long-held promise to raise the school leaving age to 16, because of the investment required in infrastructure, such as extra classrooms and teachers.

Overall, public expenditure on education rose as a proportion of GNP from 4.8% in 1964 to 5.9% in 1968, and the number of teachers in training increased by more than a third between 1964 and 1967. The percentage of students staying on at school after the age of sixteen increased similarly, and the student population increased by over 10% each year. Pupil-teacher ratios were also steadily reduced. As a result of the first Wilson government's educational policies, opportunities for working-class children were improved, while overall access to education in 1970 was broader than in 1964. As summarised by Brian Lapping,

In 1966, Wilson was created the first Chancellor of the newly created University of Bradford, a position he held until 1985.

Housing

Housing was a major policy area under the first Wilson government. During Wilson's time in office from 1964 to 1970, more new houses were built than in the last six years of the previous Conservative government. The proportion of council housing rose from 42% to 50% of the total, while the number of council homes built increased steadily, from 119,000 in 1964 to 133,000 in 1965 and 142,000 in 1966. Allowing for demolitions, 1.3 million new homes were built between 1965 and 1970, To encourage homeownership, the government introduced the Option Mortgage Scheme (1968), which made low-income housebuyers eligible for subsidies (equivalent to tax relief on mortgage interest payments). This scheme had the effect of reducing housing costs for buyers on low incomes and enabling more people to become owner-occupiers. In addition, house owners were exempted from capital gains tax. Together with the Option Mortgage Scheme, this measure stimulated the private housing market.

Significant emphasis was also placed on town planning, with new conservation areas introduced and a new generation of new towns built, notably Milton Keynes. The New Towns Acts of 1965 and 1968 together gave the government the authority (through its ministries) to designate any area of land as a site for a new town.

Urban renewal

Many subsidies were allocated to local authorities faced with acute areas of severe poverty (or other social problems). The Housing Act 1969 provided local authorities with the duty of working out what to do about 'unsatisfactory areas'. Local authorities could declare 'general improvement areas' in which they would be able to buy up land and houses and spend environmental improvement grants. On the same basis, taking geographical areas of need, a package was developed by the government which resembled a miniature poverty programme. In July 1967, the government decided to pour money into what the Plowden Committee defined as Educational Priority Areas, poverty-stricken areas where children were environmentally deprived. Some poor inner-city areas were subsequently granted EPA status (despite concerns that Local Education Authorities would be unable to finance Educational Priority Areas). From 1968 to 1970, 150 new schools were built under the educational priority programme.

Social Services and welfare

According to Tony Atkinson, social security received much more attention from the first Wilson government than it did during the previous thirteen years of Conservative government. Following its victory in the 1964 general election, Wilson's government began to increase social benefits. Prescription charges for medicines were abolished immediately, while pensions were raised to a record 21% of average male industrial wages. In 1966, the system of National Assistance (a social assistance scheme for the poor) was overhauled and renamed Supplementary Benefit. The means test was replaced with a statement of income, and benefit rates for pensioners (the great majority of claimants) were increased, granting them a real gain in income. Before the 1966 election, the widow's pension was tripled. Due to austerity measures following an economic crisis, prescription charges were re-introduced in 1968 as an alternative to cutting the hospital building programme, although those sections of the population who were most in need (including supplementary benefit claimants, the long-term sick, children, and pensioners) were exempted from charges.

The widow's earning rule was also abolished, while a range of new social benefits was introduced. An Act was passed which replaced National Assistance with Supplementary Benefits. The new Act laid down that people who satisfied its conditions were entitled to these noncontributory benefits. Unlike the National Assistance scheme, which operated like state charity for the worst-off, the new Supplementary Benefits scheme was a right of every citizen who found himself or herself in severe difficulties. Those persons over the retirement age with no means who were considered to be unable to live on the basic pension (which provided less than what the government deemed as necessary for subsistence) became entitled to a "long-term" allowance of an extra few shillings a week. Some simplification of the procedure for claiming benefits was also introduced. From 1966, an exceptionally severe disablement allowance was added, "for those claimants receiving constant attendance allowance which was paid to those with the higher or intermediate rates of constant attendance allowance and who were exceptionally severely disabled." Redundancy payments were introduced in 1965 to lessen the impact of unemployment, and earnings-related benefits for maternity, unemployment, sickness, industrial injuries and widowhood were introduced in 1966, followed by the replacement of flat-rate family allowances with an earnings-related scheme in 1968. From July 1966 onwards, the temporary allowance for widow of severely disabled pensioners was extended from 13 to 26 weeks.
 	
Increases were made in pensions and other benefits during Wilson's first year in office that were the largest ever real term increases carried out up until that point. Social security benefits were markedly increased during Wilson's first two years in office, as characterised by a budget passed in the final quarter of 1964 which raised the standard benefit rates for old age, sickness and invalidity by 18.5%. In 1965, the government increased the national assistance rate to a higher level relative to earnings, and via annual adjustments, broadly maintained the rate at between 19% and 20% of gross industrial earnings until the start of 1970. In the five years from 1964 up until the last increases made by the First Wilson Government, pensions went up by 23% in real terms, supplementary benefits by 26% in real terms, and sickness and unemployment benefits by 153% in real terms (largely as a result of the introduction of earnings-related benefits in 1967).

Agriculture
Under the First Wilson Government, subsidies for farmers were increased. Farmers who wished to leave the land or retire became eligible for grants or annuities if their holdings were sold for approved amalgamations, and could receive those benefits whether they wished to remain in their farmhouses or not. A Small Farmers Scheme was also extended, and from 1 December 1965, forty thousand more farmers became eligible for the maximum £1,000 grant. New grants to agriculture also encouraged the voluntary pooling of smallholdings, and in cases where their land was purchased for non-commercial purposes, tenant-farmers could now receive double the previous "disturbance compensation." A Hill Land Improvement Scheme, introduced by the Agriculture Act 1967, provided 50% grants for a wide range of land improvements, along with a supplementary 10% grant on drainage works benefitting hill land. The Agriculture Act 1967 also provided grants to promote farm amalgamation and to compensate outgoers.

Health
The proportion of GNP spent on the National Health Service rose from 4.2% in 1964 to about 5% in 1969. This additional expenditure provided for an energetic revival of a policy of building health centres for general practitioners, extra pay for doctors who served in areas particularly short of them, significant growth in hospital staffing, and a significant increase in a hospital building programme. Far more money was spent each year on the NHS than under the 1951–64 Conservative governments, while much more effort was put into modernising and reorganising the health service. Stronger central and regional organisations were established for bulk purchase of hospital supplies, while some efforts were made to reduce inequalities in standards of care. In addition, the government increased the intake to medical schools.

The 1966 Doctor's Charter introduced allowances for rent and ancillary staff, significantly increased the pay scales, and changed the structure of payments to reflect "both qualifications of doctors and the form of their practices, i.e. group practice." These changes not only led to higher morale, but also resulted in the increased use of ancillary staff and nursing attachments, growth in the number of health centres and group practices, and a boost in the modernisation of practices in terms of equipment, appointment systems, and buildings. The charter introduced a new system of payment for GPs, with refunds for surgery, rents, and rates, to ensure that the costs of improving his surgery did not diminish the doctor's income, together with allowances for the greater part of ancillary staff costs. In addition, a Royal Commission on medical education was set up, partly to draw up ideas for training GPs (since these doctors, the largest group of all doctors in the country, had previously not received any special training, "merely being those who, at the end of their pre-doctoral courses, did not go on for further training in any speciality").

In 1967, local authorities were empowered to provide free family planning advice and means-tested contraceptive devices. In addition, medical training was expanded following the Todd Report on medical education in 1968. In addition, National Health expenditure rose from 4.2% of GNP in 1964 to 5% in 1969 and spending on hospital construction doubled. The Health Services and Public Health Act 1968 empowered local authorities to maintain workshops for the elderly either directly or via the agency of a voluntary body. A Health Advisory Service was later established to investigate and confront the problems of long-term psychiatric and mentally subnormal hospitals in the wave of numerous scandals. The Clean Air Act 1968 extended powers to combat air pollution. More money was also allocated to hospitals treating the mentally ill. In addition, a Sports Council was set up to improve facilities. Direct government expenditure on sports more than doubled from £0.9 million in 1964/65 to £2 million in 1967/68, while 11 regional Sports Councils had been set up by 1968. In Wales, five new health centres had been opened by 1968, whereas none had been opened from 1951 to 1964, while spending on health and welfare services in the region went up from £55.8 million in 1963/64 to £83.9 million in 1967/68.

Workers

The Industrial Training Act 1964 set up an Industrial Training Board to encourage training for people in work, and within 7 years there were "27 ITBs covering employers with some 15 million workers." From 1964 to 1968, the number of training places had doubled. The Docks and Harbours Act (1966) and the Dock Labour Scheme (1967) reorganised the system of employment in the docks in order to put an end to casual employment. The changes made to the Dock Labour Scheme in 1967 ensured a complete end to casual labour on the docks, effectively giving workers the security of jobs for life. Trade unions also benefited from the passage of the Trade Dispute Act 1965. This restored the legal immunity of trade union officials, thus ensuring that they could no longer be sued for threatening to strike.

The First Wilson Government also encouraged married women to return to teaching and improved Assistance Board Concessionary conditions for those teaching part-time, "by enabling them to qualify for pension rights and by formulating a uniform scale of payment throughout the country." Soon after coming into office, midwives and nurses were given an 11% pay increase, and according to one MP, nurses also benefited from the largest pay rise they had received in a generation. In May 1966, Wilson announced 30% pay rises for doctors and dentists—a move which did not prove popular with unions, as the national pay policy at the time was for rises of between 3% and 3.5%.

Much needed improvements were made in junior hospital doctors' salaries. From 1959 to 1970, while the earnings of manual workers increased by 75%, the salaries of registrars more than doubled while those of house officers more than trebled. Most of these improvements, such as for nurses, came in the pay settlements of 1970. On a limited scale, reports by the National Board for Prices and Incomes encouraged incentive payments schemes to be developed in local government and elsewhere. In February 1969, the government accepted an "above the ceiling" increase for farmworkers, a low-paid group. Some groups of professional workers, such as nurses, teachers, and doctors, gained substantial awards.

Transport
The Travel Concessions Act 1964, one of the first Acts passed by the First Wilson Government, provided concessions to all pensioners travelling on buses operated by municipal transport authorities. The Transport Act 1968 established the principle of government grants for transport authorities if uneconomic passenger services were justified on social grounds. A National Freight Corporation was also established to provide integrated rail freight and road services. Public expenditure on roads steadily increased and stricter safety precautions were introduced, such as the breathalyser test for drunken driving, under the 1967 Road Traffic Act. The Transport Act gave a much needed financial boost to British Rail, treating them like they were a company which had become bankrupt but could now, under new management, carry on debt-free. The act also established a national freight corporation and introduced government rail subsidies for passenger transport on the same basis as existing subsidies for roads to enable local authorities to improve public transport in their areas.

The road-building programme was also expanded, with capital expenditure increased to 8% of GDP, "the highest level achieved by any post-war government". Central government expenditure on roads went up from £125 million in 1963/64 to £225 million in 1967/68, while a number of road safety regulations were introduced, covering seat belts, lorry drivers' hours, car and lorry standards, and an experimental 70 mile per hour speed limit. In Scotland, spending on trunk roads went up from £6.8 million in 1963/64 to £15.5 million in 1966/67, while in Wales, spending on Welsh roads went up from £21.2 million in 1963/64 to £31.4 million in 1966/67.

Regional development
Encouragement of regional development was given increased attention under the First Wilson Government, to narrow economic disparities between the various regions. A policy was introduced in 1965 whereby any new government organisation should be established outside London and in 1967 the government decided to give preference to development areas. A few government departments were also moved out of London, with the Royal Mint moved to South Wales, the Giro and Inland Revenue to Bootle, and the Motor Tax Office to Swansea. A new Special Development Status was also introduced in 1967 to provide even higher levels of assistance. In 1966, five development areas (covering half the population in the UK) were established, while subsidies were provided for employers recruiting new employees in the Development Areas. A Highlands and Islands Development Board was also set up to "re-invigorate" the north of Scotland.

The Industrial Development Act 1966 changed the name of Development Districts (parts of the country with higher levels of unemployment than the national average and which governments sought to encourage greater investment in) to Development Areas and increased the percentage of the workforce covered by development schemes from 15% to 20%, which mainly affected rural areas in Scotland and Wales. Tax allowances were replaced by grants to extend coverage to include firms which were not making a profit, and in 1967 a Regional Employment Premium was introduced. Whereas the existing schemes tended to favour capital-intensive projects, this aimed for the first time at increasing employment in depressed areas. Set at 30s per employee per week and guaranteed for seven years, the Regional Employment Premium subsidised all manufacturing industry (though not services) in Development Areas, amounting to an average subsidy of 7% of labour costs.

Regional unemployment differentials were narrowed, and spending on regional infrastructure was significantly increased. Between 1965–66 and 1969–70, yearly expenditure on new construction (including power stations, roads, schools, hospitals and housing) rose by 41% in the United Kingdom as a whole. Subsidies were also provided for various industries (such as shipbuilding in Clydeside), which helped to prevent many job losses. It is estimated that, between 1964 and 1970, 45,000 government jobs were created outside London, 21,000 of which were located in the Development Areas. The Local Employment Act, passed in March 1970, embodied the government's proposals for assistance to 54 "intermediate" employment exchange areas not classified as full "development" areas.

Funds allocated to regional assistance more than doubled, from £40 million in 1964/65 to £82 million in 1969/70, and from 1964 to 1970, the number of factories completed was 50% higher than from 1960 to 1964, which helped to reduce unemployment in development areas. In 1970, the unemployment rate in development areas was 1.67 times the national average, compared to 2.21 times in 1964. Although national rates of unemployment were higher in 1970 than in the early 1960s, unemployment rates in the development areas were lower and had not increased for three years. Altogether, the impact of the first Wilson government's regional development policies was such that, according to one historian, the period 1963 to 1970 represented "the most prolonged, most intensive, and most successful attack ever launched on regional problems in Britain."

International development
A new Ministry of Overseas Development was established, with its greatest success at the time being the introduction of interest-free loans for the poorest countries. The Minister of Overseas Development, Barbara Castle, set a standard in interest relief on loans to developing nations which resulted in changes to the loan policies of many donor countries, "a significant shift in the conduct of rich white nations to poor brown ones." Loans were introduced to developing countries on terms that were more favourable to them than those given by governments of all other developed countries at that time. In addition, Castle was instrumental in setting up an Institute of Development Studies at the University of Sussex to devise ways of tackling global socio-economic inequalities. Overseas aid suffered from the austerity measures introduced by the first Wilson government in its last few years in office, with British aid as a percentage of GNP falling from 0.53% in 1964 to 0.39% in 1969.

Taxation
Wilson's government made a variety of changes to the tax system. Largely under the influence of the Hungarian-born economists Nicholas Kaldor and Thomas Balogh, an idiosyncratic Selective Employment Tax (SET) was introduced that was designed to tax employment in the service sectors while subsidising employment in manufacturing. (The rationale proposed by its economist authors derived largely from claims about potential economies of scale and technological progress, but Wilson in his memoirs stressed the tax's revenue-raising potential.) The SET did not long survive the return of a Conservative government. Of longer-term significance, capital gains tax (CGT) was introduced across the UK on 6 April 1965. Across his two periods in office, Wilson presided over significant increases in the overall tax burden in the UK. In 1974, three weeks after forming a new government, Wilson's new chancellor Denis Healey partially reversed the 1971 reduction in the top rate of tax from 90% to 75%, increasing it to 83% in his first budget, which came into law in April 1974. This applied to incomes over £20,000 (equivalent to £ in ), and combined with a 15% surcharge on 'unearned' income (investments and dividends) could add up to a 98% marginal rate of personal income tax. In 1974, as many as 750,000 people were liable to pay the top rate of income tax.

Various changes were also made to the tax system which benefited workers on low and middle incomes. Married couples with low incomes benefited from the increases in the single personal allowance and marriage allowance. In 1965, the regressive allowance for national insurance contributions was abolished and the single personal allowance, marriage allowance and wife's earned income relief were increased. These allowances were further increased in the tax years 1969–70 and 1970–71. Increases in the age exemption and dependant relative's income limits benefited the low-income elderly. In 1967, new tax concessions were introduced for widows.

Increases were made in some of the minor allowances in the 1969 Finance Act, notably the additional personal allowance, the age exemption and age relief and the dependent relative limit. Apart from the age relief, further adjustments in these concessions were implemented in 1970.

1968 saw the introduction of aggregation of the investment income of unmarried minors with the income of their parents. According to Michael Meacher, this change put an end to a previous inequity whereby two families, in otherwise identical circumstances, paid differing amounts of tax "simply because in one case the child possessed property transferred to it by a grandparent, while in the other case the grandparent's identical property was inherited by the parent."

In the 1969 budget, income tax was abolished for about 1 million of the lowest-paid and reduced for a further 600,000 people, while in the government's last budget (introduced in 1970), two million small taxpayers were exempted from paying any income tax altogether.

Liberal reforms

A wide range of liberal measures were introduced during Wilson's time in office. The Matrimonial Proceedings and Property Act 1970 made provision for the welfare of children whose parents were about to divorce or be judicially separated, with courts (for instance) granted wide powers to order financial provision for children in the form of maintenance payments made by either parent. This legislation allowed courts to order provision for either spouse and recognised the contribution to the joint home made during marriage. That same year, spouses were given an equal share of household assets following divorce via the Matrimonial Property Act. The Race Relations Act 1968 was also extended in 1968 and in 1970 the Equal Pay Act 1970 was passed. Another important reform, the Welsh Language Act 1967, granted 'equal validity' to the declining Welsh language and encouraged its revival. Government expenditure was also increased on both sport and the arts. The Mines and Quarries (Tips) Act 1969, passed in response to the Aberfan disaster, made provision for preventing disused tips from endangering members of the public. In 1967, corporal punishment in borstals and prisons was abolished. 7 regional associations were established to develop the arts, and government expenditure on cultural activities rose from £7.7 million in 1964/64 to £15.3 million in 1968/69. A Criminal Injuries Compensation Board was also set up, which had paid out over £2 million to victims of criminal violence by 1968.
 
The Commons Registration Act 1965 provided for the registration of all common land and village greens, whilst under the Countryside Act 1968, local authorities could provide facilities "for enjoyment of such lands to which the public has access". The Family Provision Act 1966 amended a series of pre-existing estate laws mainly related to persons who died intestate. The legislation increased the amount that could be paid to surviving spouses if a will had not been left, and also expanded upon the jurisdiction of county courts, which were given the jurisdiction of high courts under certain circumstances when handling matters of estate. The rights of adopted children were also improved with certain wording changed in the Inheritance (Family Provision) Act 1938 to bestow upon them the same rights as natural-born children. In 1968, the Nurseries and Child-Minders Regulation Act 1948 was updated to include more categories of childminders. A year later, the Family Law Reform Act 1969 was passed, which allowed people born outside marriage to inherit on the intestacy of either parent. In 1967, homosexuality was partially decriminalised (in England & Wales only) by the passage of the Sexual Offences Act. The Public Records Act 1967 also introduced a thirty-year rule for access to public records, replacing a previous fifty-year rule.

Industrial relations
Wilson made periodic attempts to mitigate inflation, largely through wage-price controls—better known in Britain as "prices and incomes policy". (As with indicative planning, such controls—though now generally out of favour—were widely adopted at that time by governments of different ideological complexions, including the Nixon administration in the United States.) Partly as a result of this reliance, the government tended to find itself repeatedly injected into major industrial disputes, with late-night "beer and sandwiches at Number Ten" an almost routine culmination to such episodes. Among the most damaging of the numerous strikes during Wilson's periods in office was a six-week stoppage by the National Union of Seamen, beginning shortly after Wilson's re-election in 1966, and conducted, he claimed, by "politically motivated men".

With public frustration over strikes mounting, Wilson's government in 1969 proposed a series of changes to the legal basis for industrial relations (labour law), which were outlined in a White Paper "In Place of Strife" put forward by the Employment Secretary Barbara Castle. Following a confrontation with the Trades Union Congress, which strongly opposed the proposals, and internal dissent from Home Secretary James Callaghan, the government substantially backed-down from its intentions. The Heath government (1970–1974) introduced the Industrial Relations Act 1971 with many of the same ideas, but this was largely repealed by the post-1974 Labour government. Some elements of these changes were subsequently to be enacted (in modified form) during the premiership of Margaret Thatcher.

Record on income distribution
Despite the economic difficulties faced by the first Wilson government, it succeeded in maintaining low levels of unemployment and inflation during its time in office. Unemployment was kept below 2.7%, and inflation for much of the 1960s remained below 4%. Living standards generally improved, while public spending on housing, social security, transport, research, education and health went up by an average of more than 6% between 1964 and 1970. The average household grew steadily richer, with the number of cars in the United Kingdom rising from one to every 6.4 persons to one for every five persons in 1968, representing a net increase of three million cars on the road. The rise in the standard of living was also characterised by increased ownership of various consumer durables from 1964 to 1969, as demonstrated by television sets (from 88% to 90%), refrigerators (from 39% to 59%), and washing machines (from 54% to 64%).

By 1970, income in Britain was more equally distributed than in 1964, mainly because of increases in cash benefits, including family allowances.

According to the historian, Dominic Sandbrook:

As noted by Ben Pimlott, the gap between those on lowest incomes and the rest of the population "had been significantly reduced" under Wilson's first government. The first Wilson government thus saw the distribution of income became more equal, while reductions in poverty took place. These achievements were mainly brought about by several increases in social welfare benefits, such as supplementary benefit, pensions and family allowances, the latter of which were doubled between 1964 and 1970 (although most of the increase in family allowances did not come about until 1968). A new system of rate rebates was introduced, which benefited one million households by the end of the 1960s. Increases in national insurance benefits in 1965, 1967, 1968 and 1969 ensured that those dependent on state benefits saw their disposable incomes rise faster than manual wage earners, while income differentials between lower-income and higher-income workers were marginally narrowed. Greater progressivity was introduced in the tax system, with greater emphasis on direct (income-based) as opposed to indirect (typically expenditure-based) taxation as a means of raising revenue, with the amount raised by the former increasing twice as much as that of the latter. Also, despite an increase in unemployment, the poor improved their share of the national income while that of the rich was slightly reduced. Despite various cutbacks after 1966, expenditure on services such as education and health was still much higher as a proportion of national wealth than in 1964. In addition, by raising taxes to pay their reforms, the government paid careful attention to the principle of redistribution, with disposable incomes rising for the lowest paid while falling amongst the wealthiest during its time in office.

Between 1964 and 1968, benefits in kind were significantly progressive, in that over the period those in the lower half of the income scale benefited more than those in the upper half. On average those receiving state benefits benefited more in terms of increases in real disposable income than the average manual worker or salaried employee between 1964 and 1969. From 1964 to 1969, low-wage earners did substantially better than other sections of the population. In 1969, a married couple with two children were 11.5% per cent richer in real terms, while for a couple with three children, the corresponding increase was 14.5%, and for a family with four children, 16.5%. From 1965 to 1968, the income of single pensioner households as a percentage of other one adult households rose from 48.9% to 52.5%. For two pensioner households, the equivalent increase was from 46.8% to 48.2%. In addition, mainly as a result of big increases in cash benefits, unemployed persons and large families gained more in terms of real disposable income than the rest of the population during Wilson's time in office.

As noted by Paul Whiteley, pensions, sickness, unemployment, and supplementary benefits went up more in real terms under the First Wilson Government than under the preceding Conservative administration:

"To compare the Conservative period of office with the Labour period, we can use the changes in benefits per year as a rough estimate of comparative performance. For the Conservatives and Labour respectively increases in supplementary benefits per year were 3.5 and 5.2 percentage points, for sickness and unemployment benefits 5.8 and 30.6 percentage points, for pensions 3.8 and 4.6, and for family allowances −1.2 and −2.6. Thus the poor, the retired, the sick and the unemployed did better in real terms under Labour than they did under Conservatives, and families did worse."

Between 1964 and 1968, cash benefits rose as a percentage of income for all households but more so for poorer than for wealthier households. As noted by the economist Michael Stewart,

"it seems indisputable that the high priority the Labour Government gave to expenditure on education and the health service had a favourable effect on income distribution."

For a family with two children in the income range £676 to £816 per annum, cash benefits rose from 4% of income in 1964 to 22% in 1968, compared with a change from 1% to 2% for a similar family in the income range £2,122 to £2,566 over the same period. For benefits in kind the changes over the same period for similar families were from 21% to 29% for lower-income families and from 9% to 10% for higher-income families. When taking into account all benefits, taxes and Government expenditures on social services, the first Wilson government succeeded in bringing about a reduction in income inequality. As noted by the historian Kenneth O. Morgan,

"In the long term, therefore, fortified by increases in supplementary and other benefits under the Crossman regime in 1968–70, the welfare state had made some impact, almost by inadvertence, on social inequality and the maldistribution of real income".

Public expenditure as a percentage of GDP rose significantly under the 1964–1970 Labour government, from 34% in 1964–65 to nearly 38% of GDP by 1969–70, whilst expenditure on social services rose from 16% of national income in 1964 to 23% by 1970. These measures had a major impact on the living standards of low-income Britons, with disposable incomes rising faster for low-income groups than for high-income groups during the 1960s. When measuring disposable income after taxation but including benefits, the total disposable income of those on the highest incomes fell by 33%, whilst the total disposable income of those on the lowest incomes rose by 104%. As noted by one historian, "the net effect of Labour's financial policies was indeed to make the rich poorer and the poor richer".

External affairs

United States

Wilson believed in a strong "Special Relationship" with the United States and wanted to highlight his dealings with the White House to strengthen his prestige as a statesman. President Lyndon B. Johnson disliked Wilson and ignored any "special" relationship. The Vietnam War was a sore point. Johnson needed and asked for help to maintain American prestige. Wilson offered lukewarm verbal support and no military aid. Wilson's policy angered the left-wing of his Labour Party, who opposed the Vietnam War. Wilson and Johnson also differed sharply on British economic weakness and its declining status as a world power. Historian Jonathan Colman concludes it made for the most unsatisfactory "special" relationship in the 20th century.  The only point of total agreement was that both Johnson and Wilson emphatically supported Israel in the 1967 Six-Day War.

Europe

Among the more challenging political dilemmas Wilson faced was the issue of British membership of the European Community, the forerunner of the present European Union. An entry attempt was vetoed in 1963 by French President Charles de Gaulle. The Labour Party in Opposition had been divided on the issue, with Hugh Gaitskell having come out in 1962 in opposition to Britain joining the European Community. After initial hesitation, Wilson's Government in May 1967 lodged the UK's second application to join the European Community. It was vetoed by de Gaulle in November 1967. After De Gaulle lost power, Conservative prime minister Edward Heath negotiated Britain's admission to the EC in 1973.

Wilson in opposition showed political ingenuity in devising a position that both sides of the party could agree on, opposing the terms negotiated by Heath but not membership in principle. Labour's 1974 manifesto included a pledge to renegotiate terms for Britain's membership and then hold a referendum on whether to stay in the EC on the new terms. This was a constitutional procedure without precedent in British history.

Following Wilson's return to power, the renegotiations with Britain's fellow EC members were carried out by Wilson himself in tandem with Foreign Secretary James Callaghan, and they toured the capital cities of Europe meeting their European counterparts. The discussions focused primarily on Britain's net budgetary contribution to the EC. As a small agricultural producer heavily dependent on imports, Britain suffered doubly from the dominance of:
(i) agricultural spending in the EC budget,
(ii) agricultural import taxes as a source of EC revenues.

During the renegotiations, other EEC members conceded, as a partial offset, the establishment of a significant European Regional Development Fund (ERDF), from which it was agreed that Britain would be a major net beneficiary.

In the subsequent referendum campaign, rather than the normal British tradition of "collective responsibility", under which the government takes a policy position which all cabinet members are required to support publicly, members of the Government were free to present their views on either side of the question. The electorate voted on 5 June 1975 to continue membership, by a substantial majority.

Asia
American military involvement in Vietnam escalated continuously from 1964 to 1968 and President Lyndon B. Johnson brought pressure to bear for at least a token involvement of British military units. Wilson consistently avoided any commitment of British forces, giving as reasons British military commitments to the Malayan Emergency and British co-chairmanship of the 1954 Geneva Conference.

His government offered some rhetorical support for the US position (most prominently in the defence offered by the Foreign Secretary Michael Stewart in a much-publicised "teach-in" or debate on Vietnam). On at least one occasion the British government made an unsuccessful effort to mediate in the conflict, with Wilson discussing peace proposals with Alexei Kosygin, the Chairman of the USSR Council of Ministers. On 28 June 1966 Wilson 'dissociated' his Government from American bombing of the cities of Hanoi and Haiphong. In his memoirs, Wilson writes of "selling LBJ a bum steer", a reference to Johnson's Texas roots, which conjured up images of cattle and cowboys in British minds.

Part of the price paid by Wilson after talks with President Johnson in June 1967 for US assistance with the UK economy was his agreement to maintain a military presence East of Suez. In July 1967 Defence Secretary Denis Healey announced that Britain would abandon her mainland bases East of Suez by 1977, although airmobile forces would be retained which could if necessary be deployed in the region. Shortly afterwards, in January 1968, Wilson announced that the proposed timetable for this withdrawal was to be accelerated and that British forces were to be withdrawn from Singapore, Malaysia, and the Persian Gulf by the end of 1971.

Wilson was known for his strongly pro-Israel views. He was a particular friend of Israeli Premier Golda Meir, though her tenure largely coincided with Wilson's 1970–1974 hiatus. Another associate was West German Chancellor Willy Brandt; all three were members of the Socialist International.

Africa
The British "retreat from Empire" had made headway by 1964 and was to continue during Wilson's administration. Southern Rhodesia was not granted independence, principally because Wilson refused to grant independence to the white minority government headed by Rhodesian Prime Minister Ian Smith which was not willing to extend unqualified voting rights to the native African population. Smith's defiant response was a Unilateral Declaration of Independence, on 11 November 1965. Wilson's immediate recourse was to the United Nations, and in 1965, the Security Council imposed sanctions, which were to last until official independence in 1979. This involved British warships blockading the port of Beira to try to cause economic collapse in Rhodesia. Wilson was applauded by most nations for taking a firm stand on the issue (and none extended diplomatic recognition to the Smith régime). A number of nations did not join in with sanctions, undermining their efficiency. Certain sections of public opinion started to question their efficacy, and to demand the toppling of the régime by force. Wilson declined to intervene in Rhodesia with military force, believing the British population would not support such action against their "kith and kin". Smith subsequently attacked Wilson in his memoirs, accusing him of delaying tactics during negotiations and alleging duplicity; Wilson responded in kind, questioning Smith's good faith and suggesting that Smith had moved the goal-posts whenever a settlement appeared in sight. The matter was still unresolved at the time of Wilson's resignation in 1976. Wilson had a good relationship with Siaka Stevens of Sierra Leone, the two leaders attempted to work together to find a solution the question of Biafra in Nigeria.

Defeat and return to opposition, 1970–1974

By 1969, the Labour Party was suffering serious electoral reverses, and by the turn of 1970 had lost a total of 16 seats in by-elections since the previous general election.

By 1970, the economy was showing signs of improvement, and by May that year, Labour had overtaken the Conservatives in the opinion polls. Wilson responded to this apparent recovery in his government's popularity by calling a general election, but, to the surprise of most observers, was defeated at the polls by the Conservatives under Heath. Most opinion polls had predicted a Labour win, with a poll six days before the election showing a 12.4% Labour lead. Writing in the aftermath of the election, The Times journalist George Clark wrote that the 1970 contest would be "remembered as the occasion when the people of the United Kingdom hurled the findings of the opinion polls back into the faces of the pollsters and at the voting booths proved them wrong—most of them badly wrong". Heath and the Conservatives had attacked Wilson over the economy. Towards the end of the campaign, bad trade figures for May added weight to Heath's campaign and he claimed that a Labour victory would result in a further devaluation. Wilson considered Heath's claims "irresponsible" and "damaging to the nation". Ultimately, however, the election saw Labour's vote share fall to its lowest since 1935. Several prominent Labour figures lost their seats, notably George Brown who was still Deputy Leader of the Labour Party.

Wilson survived as leader of the Labour Party in opposition. In August 1973, holidaying on the Isles of Scilly, he tried to board a motorboat from a dinghy and stepped into the sea. He was unable to get into the boat and was left in the cold water for more than half an hour, hanging on to the fenders of the motorboat. He was close to death before he was saved by Paul Wolff, the father of novelist Isabel Wolff. When word of the incident became public the following month, Wilson downplayed its severity; it was taken up by the press and resulted in some embarrassment. His press secretary, Joe Haines, tried to deflect some of the comment by blaming Wilson's dog Paddy for the problem.

Economic conditions during the 1970s were becoming more difficult for Britain and many other western economies as a result of the Nixon shock and the 1973 oil crisis, and the Heath government in its turn was buffeted by economic adversity and industrial unrest (notably including confrontation with the coalminers which led to the Three-Day Week) towards the end of 1973, and on 7 February 1974 (with the crisis still ongoing) Heath called a snap election for 28 February.

Second period as prime minister (1974–1976)

Labour won more seats (though fewer votes) than the Conservative Party in the general election in February 1974, which resulted in a hung parliament. As Heath was unable to persuade the Liberals to form a coalition, Wilson returned to 10 Downing Street on 4 March 1974 as prime minister of a minority Labour Government. He gained a three-seat majority in another election later that year, on 10 October 1974.

One of the key issues addressed during his second period in office was the referendum on British membership of the European Community (EC) which took place in June 1975: Labour had pledged in its February 1974 manifesto to renegotiate the terms of British accession to the EC, and then to consult the public in a referendum on whether Britain should stay in on the new terms. Although the government recommended a vote in favour of continued membership, the cabinet was split on the issue, and Ministers were allowed to campaign on different sides of the question. The referendum resulted in a near two-to-one majority in favour of Britain remaining in the EC.

Domestic affairs
The Second Wilson Government made a major commitment to the expansion of the British welfare state, with increased spending on education, health, and housing rents. To pay for it, it imposed controls and raised taxes on the rich. It partially reversed the 1971 reduction in the top rate of tax from 90% to 75%, increasing it to 83% in the first budget from new chancellor Denis Healey, which came into law in April 1974. Also implemented was an investment income surcharge which raised the top rate on investment income to 98%, the highest level since the Second World War.

Despite its achievements in social policy, Wilson's government came under scrutiny in 1975 for the rise in the unemployment rate, with the total number of Britons out of work passing one million by that April.

Wilson's second government came into office at a troubled time for the British economy, due to a global recession and stagflation, in large part this was due to the 1973 oil crisis, and also the preceding government's inflationary attempts to boost growth. In order to deal with inflation (which peaked at 26% in 1975) the government negotiated a 'social contract' with the Trades Union Congress to implement a voluntary incomes policy, in which pay rises were held down to limits set by the government. This policy operated with reasonable success for the next few years, and inflation fell to single figures by 1978. By 1976 the recession had ended and economic recovery began, by 1978/79 living standards recovered to the level they had been in 1973/74. The Labour governments of the 1970s did, however, manage to protect the living standards of many people from the worst effects of the recession and high inflation, with pensions increasing by 20% in real terms between 1974 and 1979, while measures such as rent and price controls and food and transport subsidies mitigated the adverse impact on the living standards of many more people.

The government's industrial policy was greatly influenced by the economist Stuart Holland and the Secretary of State for Industry Tony Benn. The centrepiece of the policy was the National Enterprise Board (NEB) which was established in 1975 and was intended to channel public investment into industry, in return for taking a holding of equity in private companies. The NEB was intended to extend public ownership of the economy as well as investing in the regeneration of industry, although it had some successes in that aim, in practice one of its main activities became that of propping up failing companies such as British Leyland. The government also continued its policy of encouraging regional development by increasing Regional Employment Premiums, which had first been established in 1967.

Northern Ireland
Wilson's earlier government had witnessed the outbreak of The Troubles in Northern Ireland. In response to a request from the Government of Northern Ireland, Wilson agreed to deploy the British Army in August 1969 to restore the peace.

While out of office in late 1971, Wilson had formulated a 16-point, 15-year programme that was designed to pave the way for the unification of Ireland. The proposal was not adopted by the then Heath government.

In May 1974, when back in office as leader of a minority government, Wilson condemned the Unionist-controlled Ulster Workers Council Strike as a "sectarian strike", which was "being done for sectarian purposes having no relation to this century but only to the seventeenth century". He refused to pressure a reluctant British Army to face down the Ulster loyalist paramilitaries who were intimidating utility workers. In a televised speech later, he referred to the loyalist strikers and their supporters as "spongers" who expected Britain to pay for their lifestyles. The strike was eventually successful in breaking the power-sharing Northern Ireland executive.

On 11 September 2008, BBC Radio 4's Document programme claimed to have unearthed a secret plan—codenamed Doomsday—which proposed to cut all of the United Kingdom's constitutional ties with Northern Ireland and transform the province into an independent dominion. Document went on to claim that the Doomsday plan was devised mainly by Wilson and was kept a closely guarded secret. The plan then allegedly lost momentum, due in part, it was claimed, to warnings made by both the then Foreign Secretary, James Callaghan, and the then Irish Minister for Foreign Affairs Garret FitzGerald who admitted the 12,000-strong Irish Army would be unable to deal with the ensuing civil war. Later, Callaghan himself spoke and wrote despondently about the prospect for a British-derived solution to the Northern Ireland issue, supporting a similar plan to push Northern Ireland towards independent status.

In 1975, Wilson secretly offered Libya's dictator Muammar Gaddafi £14 million (£500 million in 2009 values) to stop arming the Provisional Irish Republican Army, but Gaddafi demanded a far greater sum of money. This offer did not become publicly known until 2009.

Resignation

When Wilson entered office for the second time, he had privately admitted that he had lost his enthusiasm for the role, telling a close adviser in 1974 that "I have been around this racetrack so often that I cannot generate any more enthusiasm for jumping any more hurdles." On 16 March 1976, Wilson announced his resignation as prime minister (taking effect on 5 April). He claimed that he had always planned on resigning at the age of 60 and that he was physically and mentally exhausted. As early as the late 1960s he had been telling intimates, like his doctor Sir Joseph Stone (later Lord Stone of Hendon), that he did not intend to serve more than eight or nine years as prime minister. Roy Jenkins has suggested that Wilson may have been motivated partly by the distaste for politics felt by his loyal and long-suffering wife, Mary. His doctor had detected problems which would later be diagnosed as colon cancer, and Wilson had begun drinking brandy during the day to cope with stress. In addition, by 1976 he might already have been aware of the first stages of early-onset Alzheimer's disease, which was to cause both his formerly excellent memory and his powers of concentration to fail dramatically.

Wilson's Prime Minister's Resignation Honours included many businessmen and celebrities, along with his political supporters. His choice of appointments caused lasting damage to his reputation, worsened by the suggestion that the first draft of the list had been written by his political secretary Marcia Williams on lavender notepaper (it became known as the "Lavender List"). Roy Jenkins noted that Wilson's retirement "was disfigured by his, at best, eccentric resignation honours list, which gave peerages or knighthoods to some adventurous business gentlemen, several of whom were close neither to him nor to the Labour Party." Some of those whom Wilson honoured included Lord Kagan, the inventor of Gannex (Wilson's preferred raincoat), who was eventually imprisoned for fraud, and Sir Eric Miller, who later committed suicide while under police investigation for corruption.

The Labour Party held an election to replace Wilson as leader of the Party (and therefore prime minister). Six candidates stood in the first ballot; in order of votes they were: Michael Foot, James Callaghan, Roy Jenkins, Tony Benn, Denis Healey and Anthony Crosland. In the third ballot, on 5 April, Callaghan defeated Foot in a parliamentary vote of 176 to 137, thus becoming Wilson's successor as prime minister and leader of the Labour Party, and he continued to serve as prime minister until May 1979.

As Wilson wished to remain an MP after leaving office, he was not immediately given the peerage customarily offered to retired prime ministers, but instead was created a Knight of the Garter. Following his departure from the House of Commons before the 1983 general election, he was granted a life peerage as Baron Wilson of Rievaulx, of Kirklees in the County of West Yorkshire, after Rievaulx Abbey, in the north of his native Yorkshire, and Kirklees, the metropolitan borough which includes his hometown of Huddersfield.

Retirement and death, 1976–1995

He was appointed in 1976 to chair the Committee to Review the Functioning of Financial Institutions (the Wilson Committee) which reported in June 1980.

Shortly after resigning as prime minister, Wilson was signed by David Frost to host a series of interview/chat show programmes. The pilot episode proved to be a flop as Wilson appeared uncomfortable with the informality of the format. Wilson also hosted two editions of the BBC chat show Friday Night, Saturday Morning. He famously floundered in the role, and in 2000, Channel 4 chose one of his appearances as one of the 100 Moments of TV Hell.

A lifelong Gilbert and Sullivan fan, in 1975, Wilson joined the Board of Trustees of the D'Oyly Carte Trust at the invitation of Sir Hugh Wontner, who was then the Lord Mayor of London. At Christmas 1978, Wilson appeared on the Morecambe and Wise Christmas Special. Eric Morecambe's habit of appearing not to recognise the guest stars was repaid by Wilson, who referred to him throughout as 'Morry-camby' (the mispronunciation of Morecambe's name made by Ed Sullivan when the pair appeared on his famous American television show). Wilson appeared on the show again in 1980.

Wilson was not especially active in the House of Lords, although he did initiate a debate on unemployment in May 1984. His last speech was in a debate on marine pilotage in 1986, when he commented as an elder brother of Trinity House. In the same year he played himself as prime minister in an Anglia Television drama, Inside Story.

Wilson continued regularly attending the House of Lords until just over a year before his death; the last sitting he attended was on 27 April 1994. He had a picture taken with other Labour Lords on 15 June 1994, just under a year before his death. He died from colon cancer and Alzheimer's disease on 24 May 1995, aged 79. His death came five months before that of his predecessor Alec Douglas-Home.

Wilson's memorial service was held in Westminster Abbey on 13 July 1995. It was attended by the Prince of Wales, former Prime Ministers Edward Heath, James Callaghan, and Margaret Thatcher, incumbent Prime Minister John Major and also Tony Blair, then Leader of the Opposition and later Prime Minister. Wilson was buried at St Mary's Old Church, St Mary's, Isles of Scilly, on 6 June.

Political style
Wilson regarded himself as a "man of the people" and did much to promote this image, contrasting himself with the stereotypical aristocratic conservatives and other statesmen who had preceded him, as an example of social mobility. He largely retained his Yorkshire accent. Other features of this persona included his working man's Gannex raincoat, his pipe (the British Pipesmokers' Council voted him Pipe Smoker of the Year in 1965 and Pipeman of the Decade in 1976, though in private he preferred cigars), his love of simple cooking and fondness for popular British relish HP Sauce, and his support for his home town's football team, Huddersfield Town. His first general election victory relied heavily on associating these down-to-earth attributes with a sense that the UK urgently needed to modernise after "thirteen years of Tory mis-rule".

Wilson exhibited his populist touch in June 1965 when he had the Beatles honoured with the award of MBE (such awards are officially bestowed by the monarch but are nominated by the prime minister of the day). The award was popular with young people and contributed to a sense that the prime minister was "in touch" with the younger generation. There were some protests by conservatives and elderly members of the military who were earlier recipients of the award, but such protesters were in the minority. Critics claimed that Wilson acted to solicit votes for the next general election (which took place less than a year later), but defenders noted that, since the minimum voting age at that time was 21, this was hardly likely to impact many of the Beatles' fans who at that time were predominantly teenagers. It cemented Wilson's image as a modernistic leader and linked him to the burgeoning pride in the 'New Britain' typified by the Beatles. The Beatles mentioned Wilson rather negatively, naming both him and his opponent Edward Heath in George Harrison's song "Taxman", the opener to 1966's Revolver—recorded and released after the MBEs.

In 1967, Wilson had a different interaction with a musical ensemble. He sued the pop group the Move for libel after the band's manager Tony Secunda published a promotional postcard for the single "Flowers in the Rain", featuring a caricature depicting Wilson in bed with his female assistant, Marcia Williams. Gossip had hinted at an improper relationship, though these rumours were never substantiated. Wilson won the case, and all royalties from the song (composed by Move leader Roy Wood) were assigned in perpetuity to a charity of Wilson's choosing.

Wilson coined the term 'Selsdon Man' to refer to the free market policies of the Conservative leader Edward Heath, developed at a policy retreat held at the Selsdon Park Hotel in early 1970. This phrase, intended to evoke the 'primitive throwback' qualities of anthropological discoveries such as Piltdown Man and Swanscombe Man, was part of a British political tradition of referring to political trends by suffixing 'man'. Other memorable phrases attributed to Wilson include "the white heat of the [technological] revolution", and "a week is a long time in politics", meaning that political fortunes can change extremely rapidly. In his broadcast after the 1967 devaluation of the pound, Wilson said: "This does not mean that the pound here in Britain—in your pocket or purse—is worth any less" and the phrase "the pound in your pocket" subsequently took on a life of its own.

Reputation
Despite his successes, Wilson's reputation took a long time to start a recovery from the low ebb reached immediately following his second premiership. The reinvention of the Labour Party would take the better part of two decades at the hands of Neil Kinnock, John Smith and, electorally and most conclusively, Tony Blair. Disillusion with Britain's weak economic performance and troubled industrial relations, combined with active spadework by figures such as Sir Keith Joseph, had helped to make a radical market programme politically feasible for Margaret Thatcher (which was, in turn, to influence the subsequent Labour leadership, especially under Blair). An opinion poll in September 2011 found that Wilson came in third place when respondents were asked to name the best post-war Labour Party leader. He was beaten only by John Smith and Tony Blair.

According to Glen O'Hara in 2006 :
Much of the disillusionment with Harold Wilson as Labour's leader and prime minister was due to his perceived failure on the economic front. He pledged not to devalue sterling, but did exactly that in 1967; he promised to keep unemployment low, but had by 1970 accepted a higher rate of joblessness than the Conservatives had managed. Some of the elements in Labour's programme – the emphasis on steadier growth, for instance – were probably misguided. These problems and defeats have, however, obscured some of the real achievements of the period. Science and education spending grew very quickly; industrial investment rose; government was increasingly well informed and better advised about the performance of the economy. In an increasingly unstable and rapidly changing economic environment, this government's economic record is here shown to be, if not hugely impressive, then at least relatively creditable.

Possible plots and conspiracy theories

In 1963, Soviet defector Anatoliy Golitsyn is said to have secretly claimed that Wilson was a KGB agent. The majority of intelligence officers did not believe that Golitsyn was credible in this and various other claims, but a significant number did (most prominently James Jesus Angleton, Deputy Director of Operations for Counter-Intelligence at the U.S. Central Intelligence Agency) and factional strife broke out between the two groups. Former MI5 officer Peter Wright claimed in his memoirs, Spycatcher, that 30 MI5 agents then collaborated in an attempt to undermine Wilson. He retracted that claim, saying there was only one man.

In March 1987, James Miller, a former agent, claimed that the Ulster Workers Council Strike of 1974 had been promoted by MI5 to help destabilise Wilson's government. In July 1987, Labour MP Ken Livingstone used his maiden speech to raise the 1975 allegations of a former Army Press officer in Northern Ireland, Colin Wallace, who also alleged a plot to destabilise Wilson. Chris Mullin MP, speaking on 23 November 1988, argued that sources other than Peter Wright supported claims of a long-standing attempt by MI5 to undermine Wilson's government.

On the BBC television programme The Plot Against Harold Wilson, broadcast on 16 March 2006 on BBC2, it was claimed there were threats of a coup d'état against the Wilson government, which were corroborated by leading figures of the time on both the left and the right. Wilson told two BBC journalists, Barrie Penrose and Roger Courtiour, who recorded the meetings on a cassette tape recorder, that he feared he was being undermined by MI5. The first time was in the late 1960s after the Wilson Government devalued the pound sterling but the threat faded after Conservative leader Edward Heath won the election of 1970. However, after the 1972 British miners' strike Heath decided to hold an election to renew his mandate to govern in February 1974 but lost narrowly to Wilson. There was again talk of a military coup, with rumours of Lord Mountbatten as head of an interim administration after Wilson had been deposed. In 1974, the British Army occupied Heathrow Airport on the grounds of training for possible IRA terrorist action at the airport. Although the military stated that this was a planned military exercise, 10 Downing Street was not informed in advance, and Wilson himself interpreted it as a show of strength, or warning, being made by the army.

Historian Christopher Andrew's official history of MI5, The Defence of the Realm: The Authorized History of MI5, included a chapter (section E part 4) specifically alluding to a conspiracy instead of a plot against Wilson in the 1970s.:

The Director-General of the Security Service assured Prime Minister Margaret Thatcher, and she told the House of Commons on 6 May 1987:

In 2009, The Defence of the Realm held that while MI5 kept a file on Wilson from 1945 when he became an MP—because communist civil servants claimed that he had similar political sympathies—there was no bugging of his home or office, and no conspiracy against him. In 2010 newspaper reports made detailed allegations that the Cabinet Office had required that the section on bugging of 10 Downing Street be omitted from the history for "wider public interest reasons". In 1963, on Macmillan's orders following the Profumo affair, MI5 bugged the Cabinet room, the waiting room, and the prime minister's study until the devices were removed in 1977 on Callaghan's orders. From the records, it is unclear if Wilson or Heath knew of the bugging, and no recorded conversations were retained by MI5 so possibly the bugs were never activated. Professor Andrew had previously recorded in the preface of the history that "One significant excision as a result of these [Cabinet Office] requirements (in the chapter on The Wilson Plot) is, I believe, hard to justify", giving credence to these new allegations.

As a result of his concerns about the danger to British parliamentary democracy from these activities, Wilson issued instructions that no agency should ever bug the telephones of any members of Parliament, a policy (still in place) which came to be known as the Wilson Doctrine.

Honours
 Wilson was elected a Fellow of the Royal Society (FRS) in 1969 under Statute 12 of the Society's regulations, which covers people who have rendered conspicuous service to the cause of science or are such that their election would be of signal benefit to the Society.
 In 2013, the Government of Bangladesh awarded Wilson with the Friends of Liberation War Honour for highlighting the plight of the people of Bangladesh during the Bangladesh Liberation War.

Statues and other tributes

A portrait of Harold Wilson, painted by the Scottish portrait artist Cowan Dobson, hangs today at University College, Oxford. Two statues of Harold Wilson stand in prominent places. The first, unveiled by the then Prime Minister Tony Blair in July 1999, stands outside Huddersfield railway station in St George's Square, Huddersfield. Costing £70,000, the statue, designed by sculptor Ian Walters, is based on photographs taken in 1964 and depicts Wilson in walking pose at the start of his first term as prime minister. His widow, Mary requested that the eight-foot-tall monument not show Wilson holding his famous pipe as she feared it would make the representation a caricature.

A block of high-rise flats owned by Kirklees Metropolitan District Council in Huddersfield is named after Wilson.

In September 2006, Tony Blair unveiled a second bronze statue of Wilson in the latter's former constituency of Huyton, near Liverpool. The statue was created by Liverpool sculptor, Tom Murphy, and Blair paid tribute to Wilson's legacy at the unveiling, including the Open University. He added: "He also brought in a whole new culture, a whole new country. He made the country very, very different".

Also in 2006, a street on a new housing development in Tividale, West Midlands, was named Wilson Drive in honour of Wilson. Along with neighbouring new development Callaghan Drive (named after James Callaghan), it formed part of a large housing estate developed since the 1960s where all streets were named after former prime ministers or senior parliamentary figures.

Scholastic honours
 Chancellor, visitor, governor, and fellowships

Honorary degrees

Cultural depictions

See also
 History of the Labour Party (UK)
 Lord Goodman

References

Further reading

Bibliography

 Wilson, Harold. A Personal Record: The Labour Government, 1964–1970 (1971).
 Wilson, Harold. The Labour Government 1964–1970: A Personal Record (1979)

Biographical
 Farr, Martin. "Wilson, (James) Harold, 1st Baron Wilson 1916–1995." in David Loades, ed., Reader's Guide to British History London: Routledge, 2003. online at Credo Reference; historiography
 
 ; 830pp; a standard scholarly biography.
 
 , the authorized biography

Domestic policy and politics
 Blick, Andrew. "Harold Wilson, Labour and the machinery of government". Contemporary British History 20#3 (2006): 343–362.
 Butler, David, and Anthony King. The British General Election of 1964 (1965)
 Butler, David, and M. Pinto-Duschinsky. The British General Election of 1970 (1971).
 Butler, David, and Dennis Kavanagh. The British General Election of February 1974 (1974).
 Butler, David, and Dennis Kavanagh. The British General Election of October 1974 (1975).  
 
 Childs, David. Britain since 1945: A Political History (7th ed. 2012), pp. 117–161, 179–196. excerpt
 Coopey, Richard, and Steven Fielding. The Wilson Governments, 1964–1970 (1993).
 Davies, Andrew. To build a new Jerusalem: the British Labour movement from the 1880s to the 1990s (1992), pp. 209–231.
 Dell, Edmund. The Chancellors: A History of the Chancellors of the Exchequer, 1945–90 (HarperCollins, 1997) (covers economic policy under the Attlee and Wilson governments)
 Donoughue, Bernard. Prime Minister: the conduct of policy under Harold Wilson and James Callaghan (1987), highly favourable report by insider.
 Dorey, Pete. "'Well, Harold Insists on Having It!'—The Political Struggle to Establish The Open University, 1965–67." Contemporary British History 29#2 (2015): 241–272.
 Fielding, Steven, ed. The Labour governments, 1964–70, volume 1: Labour and cultural change (Manchester UP, 2003).
 Heppell, Timothy. "The Labour Party leadership election of 1963: Explaining the unexpected election of Harold Wilson." Contemporary British History 24.2 (2010): 151-171. online
 Holmes, Martin. The labour government, 1974–79: political aims and economic reality (Macmillan, 1985).
 King, Anthony. The British General Election of 1966 (1966).
 Lapping, Brian. The Labour Government, 1964–70 (Penguin books, 1970).
 Morgan, Kenneth O. The People's Peace: British History 1945–1989 (1990), pp. 239–313.
 O'Hara, Glen. From dreams to disillusionment: economic and social planning in 1960s Britain (Palgrave Macmillan, 2007) online PhD version
 Ponting, Clive. Breach of promise: Labour in power, 1964–1970 (Penguin, 1989).
 Pugh, Martin. Speak for Britain!: A New History of the Labour Party (2010), pp. 319–352.
 Rogers, Chris. "From Social Contract to 'Social Contrick': The Depoliticisation of Economic Policy‐Making under Harold Wilson, 1974–751." British Journal of Politics & International Relations 11#4 (2009): 634–651. online
 Sked, Alan and Chris Cook. Post-War Britain: A Political History (4th ed. 1993), pp. 200–253, 292–311.

Foreign policy
 Colman, Jonathan. A 'Special Relationship'? Harold Wilson, Lyndon B. Johnson, and Anglo-American Relations 'At the Summit', 1964–68 (2004) online
 Daddow, Oliver J. Harold Wilson and European integration: Britain's second application to join the EEC (Psychology Press, 2003).
 Dockrill, Saki. "Forging the Anglo‐American global defence partnership: Harold Wilson, Lyndon Johnson and the Washington summit, December 1964." Journal of Strategic Studies 23#4 (2000): 107–129.
 Ellis, Sylvia A. "Lyndon Johnson, Harold Wilson and the Vietnam War: A Not So Special Relationship?." in Jonathan Hollowell, ed., Twentieth-Century Anglo-American Relations. (Palgrave Macmillan UK, 2001), pp. 180–204.
 Haeussler, Mathias. "A Pyrrhic Victory: Harold Wilson, Helmut Schmidt, and the British Renegotiation of EC Membership, 1974–5." International History Review 37#4 (2015): 768–789.
 Hughes, Geraint. Harold Wilson's Cold War: The Labour Government and East-West Politics, 1964–1970 (2009)
 Parr, Helen. "A question of leadership: July 1966 and Harold Wilson's European decision." Contemporary British History 19.4 (2005): 437–458.
 Parr, Helen. Britain's Policy Towards the European Community: Harold Wilson and Britain's World Role, 1964–1967 (Routledge, 2005).
 Vickers, Rhiannon. "Harold Wilson, the British Labour Party, and the War in Vietnam." Journal of Cold War Studies 10.2 (2008): 41–70. online
 Young, John W. ed. The Labour governments 1964–1970 volume 2: International policy (2008).

Historiography
 Crines, Andrew S., ed. Harold Wilson: The Unprincipled Prime Minister?: A Reappraisal of Harold Wilson (2016). evaluations by scholars and politicians; excerpt
 O'Hara, Glen; Parr, Helen. "The Fall and Rise of a Reputation" Contemporary British History (2006) 20#3, pp. 295–302
 Perkins, Anne. "Labour needs to rethink Harold Wilson’s legacy. It still matters" The Guardian, 10 March 2016 
 Pimlott, Ben. Frustrate Their Knavish Tricks: Writings on Biography, History and Politics (1994) pp. 31–36.

External links

Harold Wilson & Censorship - UK Parliament Living Heritage
Lord Wilson of Rievaulx obituary in The Daily Telegraph
Harold Wilson on the Downing Street website 

|-

|-

|-

|-

|-

|-

|-

|-

|-

|-

|-

|-

|-

|-

|-

|-

|-

|-

|-

 
1916 births
1995 deaths
20th-century prime ministers of the United Kingdom
Alumni of Jesus College, Oxford
British social democrats
British Zionists
Burials in Cornwall
Chairs of the Fabian Society
Chairs of the Labour Party (UK)
Chancellors of the University of Bradford
Civil servants in the Ministry of Power
Deaths from dementia in England
Deaths from Alzheimer's disease
Deaths from cancer in England
Deaths from colorectal cancer
English Congregationalists
Fellows of New College, Oxford
Fellows of University College, Oxford
Fellows of the Royal Society (Statute 12)
Knights of the Garter
Labour Party (UK) MPs for English constituencies
Labour Party (UK) life peers
Labour Party prime ministers of the United Kingdom
Leaders of the Labour Party (UK)
Leaders of the Opposition (United Kingdom)
Members of HM Government Statistical Service
Members of the Privy Council of the United Kingdom
Ministers in the Attlee governments, 1945–1951
 
Officers of the Order of the British Empire
People associated with the Open University
People educated at Wirral Grammar School for Boys
People from Huddersfield
People of the Cold War
Politicians awarded knighthoods
Life peers created by Elizabeth II
Presidents of the Board of Trade
Presidents of the Royal Statistical Society
Prime Ministers of the United Kingdom
Shadow Chancellors of the Exchequer
UK MPs 1945–1950
UK MPs 1950–1951
UK MPs 1951–1955
UK MPs 1955–1959
UK MPs 1959–1964
UK MPs 1964–1966
UK MPs 1966–1970
UK MPs 1970–1974
UK MPs 1974
UK MPs 1974–1979
UK MPs 1979–1983